In mathematics, particularly in functional analysis, a bornological space is a type of space which, in some sense, possesses the minimum amount of structure needed to address questions of boundedness of sets and linear maps, in the same way that a topological space possesses the minimum amount of structure needed to address questions of continuity. 
Bornological spaces are distinguished by the property that a linear map from a bornological space into any locally convex spaces is continuous if and only if it is a bounded linear operator.

Bornological spaces were first studied by George Mackey. The name was coined by Bourbaki after , the French word for "bounded".

Bornologies and bounded maps

A  on a set  is a collection  of subsets of  that satisfy all the following conditions:
 covers  that is, ;
 is stable under inclusions; that is, if  and  then ;
 is stable under finite unions; that is,  if  then ;
Elements of the collection  are called  or simply  if  is understood. 

Bounded maps

Vector bornologies 

Let  be a vector space over a field  where  has a bornology  

 is a vector bornology;
Finite sums and balanced hulls of -bounded sets are -bounded;

A vector bornology  is called a  if it is stable under the formation of convex hulls (i.e. the convex hull of a bounded set is bounded) then  

Usually,  is either the real or complex numbers, in which case a vector bornology  on  will be called a  if  has a base consisting of convex sets.

Bornivorous subsets 

In a vector bornology,  is bornivorous if it absorbs every bounded balanced set and in a convex vector bornology  is bornivorous if it absorbs every bounded disk.

Two TVS topologies on the same vector space have that same bounded subsets if and only if they have the same bornivores.

Every bornivorous subset of a locally convex metrizable topological vector space is a neighborhood of the origin.

Mackey convergence 

Bornology of a topological vector space 

Induced topology 

Quasi-bornological spaces 

Quasi-bornological spaces where introduced by S. Iyahen in 1968.

A topological vector space (TVS)  with a continuous dual  is called a  if any of the following equivalent conditions holds:

Every bounded linear operator from  into another TVS is continuous.
Every bounded linear operator from  into a complete metrizable TVS is continuous.
Every knot in a bornivorous string is a neighborhood of the origin.

Every pseudometrizable TVS is quasi-bornological.  
A TVS  in which every bornivorous set is a neighborhood of the origin is a quasi-bornological space. 
If  is a quasi-bornological TVS then the finest locally convex topology on  that is coarser than  makes  into a locally convex bornological space.

Bornological space 

In functional analysis, a locally convex topological vector space is a bornological space if its topology can be recovered from its bornology in a natural way.

Every locally convex quasi-bornological space is bornological but there exist bornological spaces that are  quasi-bornological.

A topological vector space (TVS)  with a continuous dual  is called a  if it is locally convex and any of the following equivalent conditions holds:

Every bounded linear operator from  into a locally convex TVS is continuous.
In particular, any linear map that is sequentially continuous at the origin is bounded.
Every bounded linear operator from  into a seminormed space is continuous.
Every bounded linear operator from  into a Banach space is continuous.

If  is a Hausdorff locally convex space then we may add to this list:
 is the inductive limit of normed spaces.
 has both of the following properties:

Every sequentially continuous linear operator from a locally convex bornological space into a locally convex TVS is continuous, where recall that a linear operator is sequentially continuous if and only if it is sequentially continuous at the origin. 
Thus for linear maps from a bornological space into a locally convex space, continuity is equivalent to sequential continuity at the origin. More generally, we even have the following:

Sufficient conditions 

As a consequent of the Mackey–Ulam theorem, "for all practical purposes, the product of bornological spaces 
is bornological."

The following topological vector spaces are all bornological:
Any locally convex pseudometrizable TVS is bornological. 
 Thus every normed space and Fréchet space is bornological.
Any strict inductive limit of bornological spaces, in particular any strict LF-space, is bornological.
 This shows that there are bornological spaces that are not metrizable.
A countable product of locally convex bornological spaces is bornological.
Quotients of Hausdorff locally convex bornological spaces are bornological.
The direct sum and inductive limit of Hausdorff locally convex bornological spaces is bornological.
Fréchet Montel spaces have bornological strong duals.
The strong dual of every reflexive Fréchet space is bornological.
If the strong dual of a metrizable locally convex space is separable, then it is bornological.
The finest locally convex topology on a vector space is bornological.

Counterexamples

There exists a bornological LB-space whose strong bidual is  bornological. 

A closed vector subspace of a locally convex bornological space is not necessarily bornological. 
There exists a closed vector subspace of a locally convex bornological space that is complete (and so sequentially complete) but neither barrelled nor bornological. 

Bornological spaces need not be barrelled and barrelled spaces need not be bornological. Because every locally convex ultrabornological space is barrelled, it follows that a bornological space is not necessarily ultrabornological.

Properties 

The strong dual space of a locally convex bornological space is complete.
Every locally convex bornological space is infrabarrelled.
Every Hausdorff sequentially complete bornological TVS is ultrabornological.
 Thus every compete Hausdorff bornological space is ultrabornological.
 In particular, every Fréchet space is ultrabornological.
The finite product of locally convex ultrabornological spaces is ultrabornological.
Every Hausdorff bornological space is quasi-barrelled.
Given a bornological space  with continuous dual  the topology of  coincides with the Mackey topology  
 In particular, bornological spaces are Mackey spaces.
Every quasi-complete (i.e. all closed and bounded subsets are complete) bornological space is barrelled. There exist, however, bornological spaces that are not barrelled.
Every bornological space is the inductive limit of normed spaces (and Banach spaces if the space is also quasi-complete).
Let  be a metrizable locally convex space with continuous dual  Then the following are equivalent:
 is bornological.
 is quasi-barrelled.
 is barrelled.
 is a distinguished space.
If  is a linear map between locally convex spaces and if  is bornological, then the following are equivalent:
 is continuous.
 is sequentially continuous.
If  is a null sequence in  then  is a null sequence in 
If  is a Mackey convergent null sequence in  then  is a bounded subset of 
 In particular, the strong dual of a locally convex bornological space is complete. However, it need not be bornological.

Subsets

Every bornivorous subset of a locally convex metrizable topological vector space is a neighborhood of the origin.
Closed vector subspaces of bornological space need not be bornological.

Ultrabornological spaces 

A disk in a topological vector space  is called  if it absorbs all Banach disks.

If  is locally convex and Hausdorff, then a disk is infrabornivorous if and only if it absorbs all compact disks.

A locally convex space is called  if any of the following equivalent conditions hold:
Every infrabornivorous disk is a neighborhood of the origin.
 is the inductive limit of the spaces  as  varies over all compact disks in 
A seminorm on  that is bounded on each Banach disk is necessarily continuous.
For every locally convex space  and every linear map  if  is bounded on each Banach disk then  is continuous.
For every Banach space  and every linear map  if  is bounded on each Banach disk then  is continuous.

Properties 

The finite product of ultrabornological spaces is ultrabornological. Inductive limits of ultrabornological spaces are ultrabornological.

See also

References

Bibliography 

  
  
  
  
  
  
 
  
  
  
  
  
  
  
  
  
  

Topological vector spaces